The Rayside-Balfour Sabrecats were a Junior "A" ice hockey team from Rayside-Balfour, Ontario, Canada.  This defunct hockey team was a part of the Northern Ontario Junior Hockey League.

History
A very successful franchise, the Sabrecats won the Dudley Hewitt Cup three times (1997, 2000, and 2002) and a dynastic seven straight McNamara Trophies as NOJHL champions (1996–2002).  In 2000, they reached the finals of the Royal Bank Cup, only to lose a heartbreaking 2–1 game to the host Fort McMurray Oil Barons. While still playing for the Sabrecats, goaltender Sebastien Laplante was selected in the 9th round (277th overall) by the Los Angeles Kings in the 2001 NHL Entry Draft.

The team was granted a one-year leave from the NOJHL in 2005, but in Spring 2006 the NOJHL announced that the Sabrecats will not be returning and have officially folded.

Season-by-season results

Past coaches
 Larry Bedard

References

Defunct ice hockey teams in Canada
Sports teams in Greater Sudbury
Northern Ontario Junior Hockey League teams
Ice hockey clubs established in 1962
1962 establishments in Ontario
2005 disestablishments in Ontario
Ice hockey clubs disestablished in 2005